The 1971–72 DDR-Oberliga season was the 24th season of the DDR-Oberliga, the top level of ice hockey in East Germany. Two teams participated in the league, and SG Dynamo Weißwasser won the championship.

Game results

Dynamo Weißwasser wins series 11:5 in points.

References

External links
East German results 1970-1990

DDR-Oberliga (ice hockey) seasons
Ober
Ger
1971 in East German sport
1972 in East German sport